The British Virgin Islands women's national basketball team represents the British Virgin Islands (BVI) in international women's basketball competitions. It is administrated by the British Virgin Islands Amateur Basketball Federation.

See also
 British Virgin Islands women's national under-19 basketball team
 British Virgin Islands women's national under-17 basketball team
 British Virgin Islands women's national 3x3 team

References

External links
 Latinbasket.com - British Virgin Islands Women National Team 
Presentation at CaribbeanBasketball.com
British Virgin Islands Basketball Records at FIBA Archive

Women's national basketball teams
Basketball in the British Virgin Islands
Basketball teams in the British Virgin Islands
Basketball